Pongakawa is a rural community in the Bay of Plenty of New Zealand's North Island.  runs through it.

The local Tokerau Marae and Pikiao meeting house are a traditional meeting ground of the Ngāti Pikiao tribe.

The name of the settlement comes from Māori terms meaning "Bitter ferns".

Demographics

Pongakawa had a population of 3,081 at the 2018 New Zealand census, an increase of 408 people (15.3%) since the 2013 census, and an increase of 381 people (14.1%) since the 2006 census. There were 1,080 households, comprising 1,602 males and 1,476 females, giving a sex ratio of 1.09 males per female. The median age was 36.7 years (compared with 37.4 years nationally), with 741 people (24.1%) aged under 15 years, 522 (16.9%) aged 15 to 29, 1,464 (47.5%) aged 30 to 64, and 354 (11.5%) aged 65 or older.

Ethnicities were 83.3% European/Pākehā, 23.4% Māori, 1.9% Pacific peoples, 4.3% Asian, and 2.4% other ethnicities. People may identify with more than one ethnicity.

The percentage of people born overseas was 11.4, compared with 27.1% nationally.

Although some people chose not to answer the census's question about religious affiliation, 57.4% had no religion, 28.0% were Christian, 1.9% had Māori religious beliefs, 0.8% were Hindu, 0.2% were Muslim, 0.4% were Buddhist and 3.6% had other religions.

Of those at least 15 years old, 270 (11.5%) people had a bachelor's or higher degree, and 519 (22.2%) people had no formal qualifications. The median income was $36,700, compared with $31,800 nationally. 396 people (16.9%) earned over $70,000 compared to 17.2% nationally. The employment status of those at least 15 was that 1,362 (58.2%) people were employed full-time, 399 (17.1%) were part-time, and 54 (2.3%) were unemployed.

Education

References 

Western Bay of Plenty District
Populated places in the Bay of Plenty Region